Jack Lawton was an English professional footballer who played as an outside right in the Football League for Burnley. He also played for Manchester North End and Altrincham.

References

Year of birth missing
Year of death missing
English footballers
Association football outside forwards
Manchester North End F.C. players
Burnley F.C. players
Altrincham F.C. players
English Football League players
Place of birth missing
Place of death missing
Association football midfielders